Tempe may refer to:

Places
 Vale of Tempe, Greece
 Tempe, Arizona, United States
 Tempe, New South Wales, a suburb in Sydney, Australia
 Lake Tempe, Indonesia
 Tempe, Bloemfontein, South Africa, an area outside Bloemfontein, home to various military bases and units

See also
 Tempa, West Virginia, which may be named for the Vale of Tempe (see above)
 Tempeh, a traditional soy product, commonly known as tempe